Seven Golden Men Strike Again is a 1966 film directed by Marco Vicario. It is the sequel of Seven Golden Men.

Plot
The Seven Golden Men successfully pull off their gold heist at the Commercial Bank of Italy, but just as they are about to make their getaway, most of them are suddenly captured by US government agents. Albert and Giorgia escape, but later rejoin their comrades and strike a deal with Frank Rogers, head of the FBI and the mastermind behind their capture.

The Seven Golden Men are assigned by the US government to kidnap the dictator general of a Latin American island nation who is allied with the Soviets and bring him in for questioning before he is to be surreptitiously returned to his home. Giorgia is sent ahead to facilitate the kidnapping. She is discovered and captured, all according to plan, and posing as an American journalist, she uses her charm to turn the General's head. After throwing the General's army into confusion, the Golden Men successfully pull off the operation. Upon interrogating him with a mind-reading device, the US officials find the General so thoroughly infatuated with Giorgia that he readily agrees to give up his allegiance with the Soviets and become an ally of the United States.

At the same time, the Golden Men - in a private side mission set by Albert - infiltrate the island and capture a Soviet cruiser carrying 7,000 tons of gold bullion for the General's intended revolution against the Americans. They ferry the gold to a deserted island for transfer, but Adolf, put in charge by the Professor, is seduced by greed and megalomania and together with Alfred turns against his comrades. Their private war over the gold is interrupted by the arrival of Albert and Giorgia, who voice their displeasure at their avarice, and a blockade by American warships coercing them into giving up their loot. With an ingenious trick, the Golden Men manage to spirit most of the gold away to Geneva, but once again Albert intends to cheat his associates out of their share, as does Giorgia alongside the General, who is now in exile. But when the two arrive at the bank where Albert has stored the gold, they find the Golden Men at work breaking into the bank once more, since the gold was confiscated by the UNO and so they have to get it back the old-fashioned way.

Cast
 Philippe Leroy as Albert the Professor
 Rossana Podestà as Giorgia
 Gastone Moschin as Adolf
 Giampiero Albertini as August
 Maurice Poli as Alfred
 Manuel Zarzo as Alfonso
 Gabriele Tinti as Aldo
 Dario De Grassi as Anthony
 Enrico Maria Salerno as Generale

References

External links
 

1966 films
1960s Italian-language films
Italian heist films
Italian crime films
1960s heist films
Films scored by Armando Trovajoli
Italian sequel films
1960s Italian films